The Beach Volleyball tournament of the 2006 Lusophone Games was played in Macau, People's Republic of China. The venue was the Tennis Academy. The tournament was played from 13  to 15 October 2006, and there was both the men's and women's competition.

The medals were distributed between Brazil and Portugal teams, with the former winning both tournaments and a silver medal, and the latter grabbing a silver and two bronze medals.

Men's competition

Main bracket

Losers Bracket

Semi-final

Bronze-medal match

Gold-medal match

Female's Competition

Main bracket

Losers Bracket

Semi-final

Bronze-medal match

Gold-medal match

See also
ACOLOP
Lusophony Games
2006 Lusophony Games

Lusophony Games
Beach volleyball at the Lusofonia Games
2006 Lusofonia Games